Deep well may refer to:
A water well, an excavation or structure created to access groundwater in underground aquifers
Deep well drilling, the process of drilling an oil or gas well to a depth of 10,000 feet or more
Deep Wells, Nevada, a ghost town in Eureka County, Nevada
Deep Well Station, a pastoral lease and cattle station in the Northern Territory, Australia
The Deeper Well, the final resting place of the Old Ones in the Buffyverse